HMS Rising Castle was a  built for the Royal Navy in World War II. She was named for Castle Rising in Norfolk, England. Before she was commissioned she was transferred to the Royal Canadian Navy and renamed Arnprior and given a new pennant number. After the war she was sold to Uruguay and renamed Montevideo.

Design
The Castle-class corvettes were an improvement over the previous  for use as a convoy escort, due to their improved seagoing performance.

The ships were powered by two Admiralty 3-drum type water-tube boilers creating .

The class was armed with one 4-inch (102-mm) Quick Firing Mk.XIX High Angle/Low Angle combined air/surface gun, two twin 20 mm anti-aircraft cannons and six single 20 mm anti-aircraft cannons for air/surface combat. For anti-submarine warfare, the ships were equipped with one Squid anti-submarine mortar and one depth charge rail with 15 depth charges.

Construction and career
Rising Castle was ordered on 23 January 1943. She was built by Harland and Wolff, Belfast and laid down on 21 June 1943. She was launched on 8 February 1944, but was then transferred to the Royal Canadian Navy and commissioned as HMCS Arnprior (with a new pennant number) on 8 June 1944. She was then completed on 26 June 1944. The Canadian Castle-class corvettes were acquired from the Royal Navy in exchange for s.

War service
She worked up at Tobermory, after which she was assigned to the Mid-Ocean Escort Force as part of the convoy escort group C-1, based at Derry. She sailed with convoy ONM-249 on 19 August 1944. She spent the rest of the war serving in the Battle of the Atlantic as a convoy escort. After the end of the war in June 1945, Arnprior was refitted at St. John's, Newfoundland and Labrador. The refit lasted for two months and she was then based at Halifax.

Postwar service
She was decommissioned on 14 March 1946 and was sold to Uruguay. The ship was renamed Montevideo and operated as a training ship until 1975. The ship was broken up in 1975.

References

Notes

References

External links
Rising Castle at Uboat.net
Arnprior at readyayeready.com

 

Ships of the Royal Canadian Navy
Castle-class corvettes
1944 ships
Ships built in Belfast
Ships built by Harland and Wolff
Naval ships of Uruguay